Lincoln Schatz is a contemporary American artist, best known for works that utilize video to collect, store, and display images from specific environments.

Career
His CUBE project combines architecture, video and, performance using a video system to generate painterly screen-based portraits of subjects. In 2008, the Hearst Corporation commissioned Schatz to create CUBE portraits to celebrate the 75th Anniversary of Esquire magazine. The work profiled the 75 most influential people of the 21st century including George Clooney, LeBron James, Jeff Bezos, and Craig Newmark. The series of portraits was acquired by the National Portrait Gallery in 2010.

In 2007, the Billingsley Company commissioned a new work for the entrance of One Arts Plaza in the heart of the Dallas’ Arts District. Schatz also completed commissions in that year for a new Helmut Jahn-designed high-rise in Chicago at 600 Fairbanks, and another for the entrance of Chicago's McCormick Place Convention Center.

Commissioned works
Notable commissions include Qualcomm Corporate Headquarters in San Diego; Across Time, a permanent commission at the Spertus Institute of Jewish Studies in Chicago; and a work made for Shanghai contemporary art collector Pearl Lam. Work by Lincoln Schatz has been exhibited at bitforms gallery nyc and Seoul, the Hearst Tower, New York; Sundance Film Festival, Utah; Think 21 Contemporary, Brussels; PULSE Miami; ARCO Madrid; Catharine Clark Gallery, San Francisco, California; Gallery Simon, Seoul; Museum of Contemporary Art, San Diego; Quint Contemporary Art, La Jolla, California.

In THE NETWORK (Dec 2012, Collection of the National Portrait Gallery, http://thenetworkportrait.com/) Schatz created a unique portrayal of contemporary American leadership and innovation. Representing government, business, science, technology, and culture, Schatz’ eighty-nine subjects include father of the Internet Vint Cerf, Supreme Court Justice Sandra Day O’Connor, Emmy Award-winning journalist Cokie Roberts, Republican strategist Karl Rove, and liberal heavyweight Vernon Jordan. Schatz gives voice to those searching for solutions to intractable national and international problems (National Cancer Institute Director (Dr. Harold Varmus), to influential Congressmen and women from both sides of the aisle (Nancy Pelosi, Eric Cantor) and to those directly representing the strategy of the 44th President of the United States (Press Secretary Jay Carney).

Filming
Filming each portrait via multiple cameras during a forty-five-minute conversation, Schatz captures his sitters as they discuss their legacies, accomplishments, and aspirations. Working with this footage, Schatz uses custom software that constantly recombines the video based on topic – the heart of what he refers to as "the generative portrait" process – and enables him to create a dynamic, continuously evolving representation of the similarities and differences between the sitters, free of editorial input.

Concurrently, Smithsonian Books published The Network: Portrait Conversations by Lincoln Schatz. http://thenetworkportrait.com/

His work is held in numerous public and private collections including, San Jose Museum of Art; Glatzova & Co., Prague; Cafritz Collection, Washington DC; Fundación Privada Sorigué, Lleida, Spain; Post Properties, Washington D.C.; Museum of Outdoor Arts, Englewood; City of Evanston, IL; Morse Diesel Construction, Chicago; Northern Industries, Chicago; Runnymede Sculpture Farm, Woodside; Ernesto Ventos Omedes, Barcelona; Fidelity Investment, Boston; and W Hotel, Seoul.

Education
Schatz attended the Latin School of Chicago. He received his BA from Bennington College in 1986 and was the recipient of a CORE fellowship to the Glassell School of Art at the Museum of Fine Arts in Houston.

References

External links 
 Lincoln Schatz's web site
 Artnet
 About the CUBE
 bitforms gallery
 Catherine Clark Gallery

Bennington College alumni
American video artists
Living people
1963 births
Artists from Chicago
Latin School of Chicago alumni
20th-century American artists
21st-century American artists
American male artists
20th-century American male artists